Janet Marie Conrad (born 1963) is an American experimental physicist, researcher, and professor at MIT studying elementary particle physics. Her work focuses on neutrino properties and the techniques for studying them. In recognition of her efforts, Conrad has been the recipient of several highly prestigious awards during her career, including an Alfred P. Sloan Research Fellow, a Guggenheim Fellow, and the American Physical Society Maria Goeppert-Mayer Award.

Education
Conrad obtained a physics B.A. from Swarthmore College in 1985. She then went to Oxford University to complete a M.Sc. in High Energy Physics as a member of the European Muon Collaboration in 1987 then to Harvard University to complete a PhD in High Energy Physics in 1993.

Career
Following Conrad's sophomore year at Swarthmore, she spent her summer in Cambridge, Massachusetts working with Francis Pipkin at Harvard, at her uncle's suggestion. 
The following summer, Conrad worked with him at Fermilab.

After graduating from Harvard in 1993, Conrad took a position as a postdoctoral research associate at the Nevis Laboratories, operated by Columbia University. 
In 1995, she joined the Columbia Physics department as an Assistant Professor. 
In 1996 she was awarded the DOE Outstanding Junior Investigator Award for a study entitled Construction of a Decay Channel for the NuTeV Experiment at Fermilab
. 
She gained tenure at Columbia in 1999.
In 2002, she was nominated by the American Physical Society's Division of Particles and Fields for fellowship with the APS, citing "her leadership in experimental neutrino physics, particularly for initiating and leading the NuTeV decay channel experiment and the Mini-BooNe neutrino oscillations experiment". 
From 2005 until 2008, Conrad was a Columbia Distinguished Faculty Fellow, and was promoted to the endowed position of Walter O. Lecroy Professor in 2006. 
In 2008, Conrad left Columbia to join the MIT Physics Department as a Professor.

Conrad is a member of several physics collaborations, including MicroBooNE, DAEδALUS, Short-Baseline Near Detector (SBND), and IceCube. 
She was previously a member of 
Double Chooz (2006-2014),
SciBooNE (2005-2011),
MiniBooNE (1997-2014),
CCFR/NuTeV (1993-2001),
E665 (1984-1996), and
EMC (1985-1986).

In addition, she has acted as a spokesperson for IsoDAR/DAEdALUS

and MiniBooNE, of which she was a founding member.

Other
In 2012, Conrad took part in a panel with the World Science Festival, speaking to the public about neutrinos

.

Inspired by detector development efforts while working on IceCube

, 
Conrad took part in the development of a low-cost tabletop muon detector 

.

In 2015, Conrad and fellow MIT professor Lindley Winslow were consulted as experts in the culture and science of physics for the 2016 film Ghostbusters

.

Personal life
Janet Conrad was born October 23, 1963, in Wooster, Ohio. 
She was a member of 4-H as a child in Ohio.

Conrad is the niece of chemistry Nobel Laureate William Lipscomb.

Conrad is married to fellow physicist Vassili Papavassiliou, a professor at New Mexico State University

Honors and awards
 Keasby Foundation Fellowship, 1986-1987 (awarded 1985)
 Harvard Physics Department (K.T. Bainbridge) Award (1988) 
 AAUW American Dissertation Fellowship, 1991-92
 NSF Career Advancement Award, 1996
 DOE Outstanding Junior Investigator, 1996 
 NSF CAREER Award, 1998
 Presidential Early Career Award for Scientists and Engineers, 1999
 Alfred P. Sloan Research Fellow, 2000
 The Maria Goeppert-Mayer Award from the American Physical Society, 2001
 The New York City Mayor’s Award for Excellence in Science and Technology, Young Investigator, 2001
 Fellow of the American Physical Society, 2003
 Guggenheim Fellow, 2009
 Amar G. Bose Fellowship, 2014

References

External links
Janet Conrad's MIT Web Page
A 2007 colloquium delivered by Janet Conrad at Illinois Mathematics and Science Academy
3Q: Janet Conrad on the first detection of a neutrino’s cosmic source
Janet Conrad, Seeker of Neutrinos and Other Curiosities 
Physicists Say They Have Evidence For A New Fundamental Particle

1963 births
Living people
Alumni of the University of Oxford
Harvard University alumni
Swarthmore College alumni
21st-century American physicists
Experimental physicists
Neutrino physicists
20th-century American physicists
People from Wooster, Ohio
Fellows of the American Physical Society
American women physicists
21st-century American scientists
20th-century American women scientists
21st-century American women scientists
Recipients of the Presidential Early Career Award for Scientists and Engineers